Gilbert Sinoué (born 18 February 1947 in Cairo, Egypt) is a classically trained guitarist and author who has lived in France since the age of 19.  He has won major French literary awards for his books, which are written in French.  Many of his historical novels have become bestsellers.

Early life and education
At age 19, after studying at a Catholic Jesuit school in Cairo, Sinoué went to France to study at the national music conservatory in Paris.  He became skilled in classical guitar.  He later taught classical guitar to others and started writing.

Career
In 1987, at about age 40, he published his first novel, La Pourpre et l’olivier, ou Calixte 1er le pape oublié (The Crimson and the Olive Tree, or Calixte I the Forgotten Pope).  It earned the Jean d’Heurs prize for best historical novel. In 1989, he published Avicenne ou La route d'Ispahan, relating the life of Avicenna, the Persian doctor, philosopher and scientist.

His novels and other books span a variety of genres.  Sinoué's third novel The Egyptian is the first of a saga set in Egypt of the 18th and 19th centuries.  Published in 1991, this novel won the literary prize Quartier latin. In the biography L'ambassadrice (2002), Sinoué relates the life of Emma, Lady Hamilton.

In 2004 his thriller Les Silences de Dieu (The Silences of God) won le Grand prix de littérature policière (Grand Prize for Mystery/Detective Literature).

Gilbert Sinoué quickly established himself as an engaging storyteller and master of a variety of genres.  His biography, The last phar'aoh, depicts the battle of Mehmet Ali, the pacha, with the Ottoman empire.  In the thriller Le Livre de Saphir (The Sapphire Book), the narrator converses with God.

In addition to writing books, Gilbert Sinoué is a scriptwriter and screenwriter.

Bibliography

La pourpre et l'olivier (The Crimson and the Olive Tree), novel, 1987
Avicenne ou la route d'Ispahan (Avicenna or the Road to Ispahan), novel, 1989 - Based on diaries of Abu Ubaid al-Juzjani, the famous pupil of Sheykh
L'égyptienne (The Egyptian), novel, 1991
La fille du Nil (The Daughter of the Nile River), novel, 1993
Le livre de saphir (The Sapphire Book, novel, 1996
Le dernier pharaon (The Last Pharaoh), biography, 1997
L'enfant de Bruges (The Child of Bruges), novel 1999
A mon fils, à l'aube du Troisième Millénaire (To My Son, at the Dawn of the Third Millennium), 2000
Le livre des sagesses d'Orient (The Book of the Wise Men), 2000
Des jours et des nuits, (Days and Nights), novel, 2001
L'ambassadrice (The Ambassadress), biography, 2002
Akhenaton, le dieu maudit (Akhenaton, the Cursed God), 2003
Les silences de Dieu (The Silences of God), 2004
Un bateau pour l'enfer (A Ship for Hell), 2005
La reine crucifiée (The Crucified Queen), 2005
Le colonel et l'enfant-roi (The Colonel and the Royal Child), 2006
Moi, Jésus (I, Jesus), 2007
La Dame à la Lampe (The Lady of the Lamp), 2008
Erevan, ou Armenie: Le Grand Roman d'un Peuple (Erevan, or Armenia: Great Novel of a People) 2009
 Le royaume des Deux-Mers (The Kingdom of Two Seas), 2018

(Note: translation of books' titles may not be 100% accurate)

1947 births
Living people
Writers from Cairo
20th-century French novelists
21st-century French novelists
French crime fiction writers
French historical novelists
Prix des libraires winners
French male novelists
20th-century French male writers
21st-century French male writers